Natalia Millán (born 27 November 1969) is a Spanish actress, dancer and singer.

Life and career
Born in Madrid on 27 November 1969, Millán began studying at the Taller de Escuelas Imaginarias (Escuela TAI) at age 16, receiving singing lessons, jazz, interpretation and classic dance.

She worked for a brief period as a professional singer. When she was 18 years old she entered Escuela de Ballet Nacional Español, where she studied with Aurora Pons and Victoria Eugenia, and received instruction from Carmen Roque, and body expression with Arnold Taraborrelli and Agustín Bellús. She also received singing lessons at Escuela de Música Creativa and Escuela Popular de Música, working under choreographers Carmen Senra and Denisis Perdikidis, with her first performances on musicals Jesus Christ Superstar and My Fair Lady. She performed with Compañía de Tetro de la Danza in La pasión de Drácula, Al fin...Solos, Hazme de la noche un cuento by Jorge Márquez, Mata-Hari and La Reina del Nilo. With Compañía Nacional de Teatro Clásico she performed principal roles in La gran sultana and Fuente Ovejuna. She appeared in the film El Cepo in 1982, playing a character named as herself.

In 1986 for TVE she worked on El domingo es nuestro, and A Mi Manera with Jesús Hermida and Innocente Innocente. In 1987 she worked with Luis Eduardo Aute singing the poem "Tengo sed" and as a chorist with songs including "Idiosincrasia". She participated as a dancer and singer in 1996 with Pilar Miró's film Tu nombre envenena mis sueños. She appeared in El Súper – Historias de todos los días from 1996 to 1999. She was subsequently hired by Antena 3 for the TV series Policías, en el corazón de la calle.

In 2003, she took the main role in the film Nubes de Verano, released in Spanish cinemas in 2004. In 2003 she performed as Sally Bowles in the musical Cabaret. In 2005 she got a role in the film Regreso a Moira by Mateo Gil. After three seasons in Cabaret at the Nuevo Teatro Alcalá in Madrid, in 2006 Natalia was hired for the film Mi último verano con Mariam directed by Vicente Monsonís. Since 2007, she has played Elsa in El Internado, a series by Antena 3. At the beginning of 2008, she participated as a judge in Tienes Talento by Cuatro, a Spanish version of Britain's Got Talent.

In May, she performed in the musical El Mercader de Venecia, directed by Denis Rafter, playing Porcia. She also appeared in the film Sangre de Mayo by José Luis Garci. She was the protagonist in the Broadway musical Chicago, in the role of Velma Kelly.

Filmography
El cepo (1982), de Francisco Rodríguez Gordillo.
Fiebre de danza (1984), de Manuel Mateos.
No hagas planes con Marga (1988), de Rafael Alcázar.
Tu nombre envenena mis sueños (1996), de Pilar Miró.
El tiempo perdido (1997), de Norberto López Amado.
Salvaje (2002), de Joaquín Llamas.
Atraco a las 3... y media (2003), de Raúl Marchand Sánchez.
Nubes de verano (2004), de Felipe Vega.
Mi último verano con Marián (2007), de Vicent Monsonís.
Sangre de mayo (2008), de José Luis Garci.
My Heart Goes Boom! (TBA)

Television roles
Fixed roles
Un, Dos, Tres (2002-2005)
El súper (1996–1999)
Policías, en el corazón de la calle (2000–2001)
Un paso adelante (2002–2003)
Películas para no dormir: Regreso a Moira (2006), by Mateo Gil.
El internado (2007)
Velvet (2014–2016)

Episodic roles
El comisario (2000)
Siete vidas (2001)
 Agente 700 (2001)

Theatre
1986 – La reina del nilo
1990 – La pasión de Drácula
1991 – Hazme de la noche un cuento
1992 – Al fin... Solos (obra teatral – Madre Amparo – 1992...1993) – La gran sultana
1993 – Fuente Ovejuna
1999 – La última aventura
2001 – La Música ) – El Cementerio de Automóviles  – Lectura del monologo
2003 – Cabaret
2006 – La Magia de Broadway
2008 – El Mercader de Venecia
2009 – Chicago
2022-2023 - Los chicos del coro (Musical)

Prizes and nominations
2005 - Winner: Turia's Prize, Best actress (Nubes de verano)
2003 - Nominated: Silver Frames, Best theatre actress (Cabaret)
2008 - Teatro de Rojas' Prize, Best female performance
2009 - Públic TV Prize, Best drama protagonist actress

Notes

External links

Official web site

21st-century Spanish actresses
1969 births
Living people
Actresses from Madrid
20th-century Spanish actresses
Spanish female dancers
Spanish musical theatre actresses